Stanley Morgan (10 November 1929 – 24 August 2018) was an English writer and actor. He wrote fiction, in the comedy and thriller genres and had more than 40 books published between 1968 and 2006.

Biography
Originally an actor, Morgan had many jobs as a young man, including sewing machine salesman, debt collector and bank clerk. In 1951, Morgan emigrated to Canada where he spent some time working in the Bank of Nova Scotia. In 1955, he emigrated again, this time to Southern Rhodesia. He resumed his acting career there and was sponsored to return to London after winning a Best Actor award. Upon returning to London, Morgan featured mostly in voice-overs ("Mullardability" the documentary he voiced for Mullard was nominated for the Special Film BAFTA in 1970), although he did have a small role in the James Bond film Dr. No playing the Concierge in the casino who first introduces Sean Connery as James Bond. Most of his acting credits were in second-feature crime shorts filmed at Merton Park Studios.

Whilst between acting jobs in the late 1960s, Morgan began to write seriously and his first novel The Sewing Machine Man was published in 1968. Allegedly autobiographical, the novel revolved around the character Russ Tobin and Morgan went on to write a further 18 novels in the series. The latest of the Russ Tobin novels was published in 2005 after Morgan came out of retirement, mainly due to renewed interest in his work via the internet.

Along with George Harrison and Paul McCartney, Morgan was an alumnus of the Liverpool Institute High School for Boys, which he attended between 1945 and 1946.

In August 2018, Morgan's webmaster announced his death on his website. Morgan died on 24 August 2018.

Bibliography

Russ Tobin series
The Sewing Machine Man (1968) The Harcourt Press (hardback) Mayflower (paperback)
The Debt Collector (1970) Mayflower (paperback)
The Courier (1971) Mayflower (paperback)
Come Again Courier (1972) Mayflower (paperback)
 Tobin Takes Off (1973) Mayflower (paperback)
Tobin On Safari (1973) Mayflower (paperback)
Tobin In Paradise (1974) Mayflower (paperback)
Tobin In Trouble (1974) Mayflower (paperback)
Tobin For Hire (1975) Mayflower (paperback)
Tobin in Las Vegas (1975) Mayflower  (paperback)
Tobin In Tahiti (1975) Futura Books (paperback)
Tobin Down Under (1976) Futura Books (paperback)
Russ Tobin's Bedside Guide to Smoother Seduction (1976) Star Books (paperback)
Here Comes Tobin (1977) Futura Books (paperback)
Hard Up (1977) WH Allen (hardback)
Hard Up (1977) Star Books (paperback)
Russ Tobin Up Tight (1977) WH Allen (hardback)
Russ Tobin Up Tight (1978) Star Books (paperback)
Russ Tobin In Hollywood (1978) WH Allen (hardback)
Russ Tobin In Hollywood (1978) Star Books (paperback)
Tobin Among The Stars (1979) WH Allen (hardback)
Tobin Among The Stars (1979) Star Books (paperback)
Tobin Goes Cuckoo (2005) Twenty-First Century (paperback)

Fly Boys series
The Fly Boys (1974) Hart-Davis, MacGibbon (hardback)
The Fly Boys(1974) Mayflower (paperback)
The Fly Boys In London (1975)  Hart-Davis, MacGibbon (hardback)
The Fly Boys In London (1975) Mayflower (paperback)
Skyjacked (1976) WH Allen (hardback)
Skyjacked (1976) Star Books (paperback)

Michael Morgan Adventure series
Octopus Hill (1970) Mayflower (paperback)
Mission To Katuma (1973) Mayflower (paperback)

Randy Comfort series
The Rise Of Randy Comfort (1976) Futura Books (paperback)
Randy Comfort Rise Again (1977) Star Books (paperback)

Gabriel Horn series
Horn is a young man who has adventures of a sexual nature with young women. This is typical of most of Morgan's books of the late 1960s to late 1970s.THE STANLEY MORGAN FAN CLUB
A Blow For Gabriel Horn (1977)  W.H. Allen (hardback)
A Blow For Gabriel Horn (1977) Star Books (paperback)

Albert Shifty series
Inside Albert Shifty (1977) Star Books (paperback)

Other novels (non-comedy)
Too Rich To Live (1979) USA Fawcett Gold Medal (paperback)
Too Rich To Live (1980) UK Hamlyn (hardback)
Too Rich To Live (1981) UK Hamlyn (paperback)
The Dark Side Of Destiny (1982) Fawcett Gold Medal
Laura Fitzgerald (1983) Fawcett Gold Medal (paperback)
Raven (1989) Lynx Books (paperback)
Trance (2006) Twenty-First Century (paperback)

TV and filmography

Films
The Sleepwalkers 1959 (unreleased)
Gorgo (1960) – Sub-Lieutenant in Submarine Control (uncredited)
Clue of the Twisted Candle (1960, Merton Park Studios) – Sgt. Anson
The Clue Of The Silver Key (1961, Merton Park Studios) – Sgt. Anson
The Silent Weapon (1961, Merton Park Studios) – Sergeant Dobbs
Konga (1961, Merton Park Studios) – Insp. Lawson
Partners In Crime (1961, Merton Park Studios) – Sergeant Rutledge (uncredited)
The Square Mile Murder (1961 Merton Park Studios) – Detective Sergeant
The Share Out (1962, Merton Park Studios) – Detective Sgt. Anson
Hair of the Dog (1962) – Jim Lester
Dr No (1962) – Concierge in Casino (uncredited)
The L-Shaped Room (1962) – Waiter in Club
On the Beat (1962) – Policeman (uncredited)
Doomsday At Eleven (1963) – Wylie
Séance on a Wet Afternoon (1964) – Man in Trilby
Night Train To Paris (1964) – Plainclothesman
Troubled Waters (1964) – Rvd. Wilcox
The Return of Mr. Moto (1965) – Inspector Jim Halliday

TV
Never Back Losers (1962, Merton Park Studios) – Sgt. Anson / Detective Sgt. Anson / Sergeant Rutledge
Sir Francis Drake (1962) – Lieutenant
Crane (1963)
The Invisible Asset (1963, Merton Park Studios) – Airline Clerk
Gideon's Way (1964–1966) – Det. Insp. Wallace / Policeman at Hospital (uncredited) (final appearance)

Voice-overs
Someone Special (1966) – Women's British Royal Naval Service Recruitment film
Sugar As Energy (1967) – British Sugar Bureau educational film for Schools 
Vinyl Plastics in Building Design (1967) –  Imperial Chemical Industries documentary about the use of vinyl plastics in building
Men For Tomorrow (1968) – British Army Recruitment film 
Looking At Paperwork (1968) – British Productivity Council film regarding the importance of O & M in business administration
Drawing In Metric (1969) – Central Office of Information film for architects changing over to metric units within the construction industry.
Mullardability (1969) – A Mullard film showing their wide range of products in the field of electronics

Interviews
 A Comprehensive list of interviews is maintained at the Official website
 James Bond interview at From Sweden with Love

References

External links
 Official site
 Stanley Morgan Page on Twenty First Century Publishing site 
 

1929 births
2018 deaths
English writers
English male film actors
Writers from Liverpool